Advenella kashmirensis is a chemolithotrophic, mesophilic, neutrophilic, tetrathionate-oxidizing bacterium of the genus Advenella, isolated from the soil of a temperate orchard in Jammu and Kashmir in India. Tetrathiobacter kashmirensis has been reclassified  to Advenella kashmirensis. The complete genome of A. kashmirensis has been sequenced.

See also
 List of sequenced bacterial genomes

References

External links
Type strain of Advenella kashmirensis at BacDive -  the Bacterial Diversity Metadatabase

Burkholderiales
Bacteria described in 2009